German submarine U-681 was a Type VIIC U-boat of Nazi Germany's Kriegsmarine during World War II. The submarine was laid down on 12 October 1942 at the Howaldtswerke yard at Hamburg, launched on 20 November 1943, and commissioned on 3 February 1944 under the command of Oberleutnant zur See d.R. Helmut Bach.

Attached to 31st U-boat Flotilla based at Kiel, U-681 completed her training period on 31 October 1944 and was assigned to front-line service.

Design
German Type VIIC submarines were preceded by the shorter Type VIIB submarines. U-681 had a displacement of  when at the surface and  while submerged. She had two shafts and two  propellers.

U-681 was fitted with five  torpedo tubes (four fitted at the bow and one at the stern), fourteen torpedoes, one  SK C/35 naval gun, (220 rounds), one  Flak M42 and two twin  C/30 anti-aircraft guns. The boat had a complement of between forty-four and sixty.

Service history
On 10 March 1945, U-681 grounded off Scilly, damaging the pressure hull and propellers. Unable to dive, Werner Gebauer, the commander of the U-boat, headed for the Irish coast, hoping for internment by Irish authorities. However, the next morning PB4Y-1 Liberator N of VPB-103 spotted U-681 on the surface and went in for the attack. Eight depth charges further damaged the U-boat, and Gebauer ordered the crew to abandon ship. With sea cocks opened and demolition charges set, U-681 submerged followed by a massive explosion. Of the crew of 47, a British escort picked up 38 survivors.

References

Bibliography

External links

German Type VIIC submarines
1943 ships
Ships built in Hamburg
U-boats commissioned in 1944
U-boats scuttled in 1945
World War II shipwrecks in the Atlantic Ocean
World War II submarines of Germany